The Nokia E65 is a smartphone in the Eseries range, a S60 platform third edition device with slide action. It shared many of the features of the N95 (quad band GSM, 3G, WiFi, Bluetooth) released around the same time, but thinner, lighter and without the GPS. It was followed fairly quickly by the E66, which was very similar, but gained an FM radio, a newer release of S60, A2DP bluetooth, GPS and 3.2-M pixel camera.

Operation times vary depending on the network and usage.

Known issues 
Many users have experienced problems with the SIM connecting to the network after using the phone for some time. Most had to get their phone repaired or replaced. The cause seems to be a design problem in the SIM container on the chassis of the phone. The SIM container is mainly built of a thin metal foil, which in time tends to bend, thus disconnecting the SIM from the mobile phone's SIM contacts. The problem can apparently be solved just by putting a bit of paper between the metal foil and the SIM, enabling it to make contact.
There's also difficulties in making connection to WLAN networks which use EAP-PEAP and MSchapV2 protocols if you update the phone's firmware (this is true as for firmware version 3.0633.69)
Other users experience problems with the phone connecting to third party GPS devices over Bluetooth. This seems to be a compatibility flaw in the Nokia Bluetooth stack of Nokia Maps as these devices do connect well when used with Google Maps on the E65.

References

External links

 Official Nokia E65 Page
 Nokia E65 User Guide

Mobile phones introduced in 2007
Nokia ESeries
Mobile phones with infrared transmitter
Slider phones